Asko or ASKO may refer to:

 Asko (name), a male given name common in Finland and Estonia
 Askø, a Danish island
 Asko Cylinda or Asko Appliances AB, a Swedish company producing household appliances
 AskoSchönberg, a Dutch chamber orchestra
 ASKO Kara, a Togolese football club 
 ASKÖ Pasching, an Austrian football club
 ASKÖ (Austria), Association for Sport and Physical Culture in Austria

See also
 Askos (disambiguation)